Vladimir Pyotrovich Tkachenko (alternate spelling: Vladimir Tkatchenko) (born September 20, 1957 in Sochi, Russian Soviet Federative Socialist Republic, Soviet Union) is a retired Soviet and Russian professional basketball player. Tkachenko won two Summer Olympic Games medals and three FIBA World Cup medals with the senior men's Soviet Union national basketball team. He was also named both the Euroscar and the Mr. Europa in 1979. His club career lasted 16 years. He became a FIBA Hall of Fame player in 2015.

Professional career

Tkachenko began playing with Stroitel of the USSR Premiere League, during the 1973–74 season, when he was 16 years old. He continued to play for them through the 1981–82 season. In 1983, he began playing for the USSR League club CSKA Moscow, and he stayed there through the 1988–89 season. He finished his club career in the former Spanish 2nd division, with Guadalajara, in the 1989–90 season.

National team career
From 1976 to 1987, Tkachenko played on the senior men's Soviet Union national basketball team, participating in many FIBA EuroBasket and FIBA World Cup competitions. With the Soviet national team, he won numerous medals, including: two bronze medals at the 1976 Summer Olympic Games and at the 1980 Summer Olympic Games, the gold medal at the 1982 FIBA World Championship (also silver medals at the 1978 FIBA World Championship and the 1986 FIBA World Championship); as well as three gold medals at the FIBA EuroBasket: at the FIBA EuroBasket 1979, the FIBA EuroBasket 1981, and the FIBA EuroBasket 1985 (also silvers at the FIBA EuroBasket 1977 and the FIBA EuroBasket 1987).

Player profile
He could block out 2-3 opponents to give teammates a chance to grab a rebound. His offensive ability was important too, as his post up moves were basic, but effective, and his shooting was good for a player of his size, with a range of approximately 17 feet.

References

External links
Euroleague & International Statistics

1957 births
Living people
Basketball players at the 1976 Summer Olympics
Basketball players at the 1980 Summer Olympics
Basketball players at the 1988 Summer Olympics
BC Budivelnyk players
CB Guadalajara players
Centers (basketball)
FIBA EuroBasket-winning players
FIBA Hall of Fame inductees
FIBA World Championship-winning players
Medalists at the 1976 Summer Olympics
Medalists at the 1980 Summer Olympics
Olympic basketball players of the Soviet Union
Olympic bronze medalists for the Soviet Union
Olympic medalists in basketball
PBC CSKA Moscow players
Sportspeople from Sochi
Russian men's basketball players
Russian people of Ukrainian descent
Russian expatriate basketball people in Spain
Soviet expatriate sportspeople in Spain
Soviet men's basketball players
1978 FIBA World Championship players
1982 FIBA World Championship players
1986 FIBA World Championship players